American singer Kelly Clarkson has released two video albums and has appeared in forty three music videos. In 2002, she made her debut music video appearance for the video "Before Your Love", which was immediately released after winning the first season of American Idol. An accompanying music video for the companion single, "A Moment Like This", was also issued later that same year. From her debut studio album, Thankful (2003), Clarkson released music videos for the singles "Miss Independent", "Low", and "The Trouble with Love Is", the foremost of which earned her three MTV Video Music Award nominations, including Best New Artist in a Video. Thankful was immediately followed by the release of Clarkson's debut video album Miss Independent that same year. In 2004, a music video for her single "Breakaway" was released to promote the Disney feature film The Princess Diaries 2: Royal Engagement. Clarkson's sophomore studio album Breakaway (2004) issued accompanying music videos for its singles "Since U Been Gone", "Behind These Hazel Eyes", "Because of You", "Walk Away", and an additional live video for "Breakaway". The music videos for the songs "Since U Been Gone" and "Because of You" earned a total of three MTV Video Music Awards and a MuchMusic Video Award. Clarkson's second video album Behind Hazel Eyes was released in 2005 as a companion piece to Breakaway.

From her third studio album My December (2007), three music videos were issued to accompany its singles "Never Again", "One Minute", and "Don't Waste Your Time". In 2009, Clarkson's fourth studio album All I Ever Wanted released three music videos for the songs "My Life Would Suck Without You", "I Do Not Hook Up", and "Already Gone", with the foremost receiving a MTV Video Music Award nomination. From 2011 to 2012, three music videos were released from her fifth studio album Stronger to accompany its singles "Mr. Know It All", "Stronger (What Doesn't Kill You)", and "Dark Side", all of which collective earned three nominations for an MTV Video Music Award and MuchMusic Video Award. Stronger was followed by her first greatest hits album, Greatest Hits – Chapter One (2012), which released music videos for its singles "Catch My Breath", "Don't Rush" and "People Like Us", the latter two of which was nominated for a CMT Music Award and an MTV Video Music Award, respectively. From 2013 to 2014, three music videos were released to promote her first Christmas album Wrapped in Red: two live performance videos for the songs "Underneath the Tree" and "Silent Night" from the television special Kelly Clarkson's Cautionary Christmas Music Tale, and an accompaniment video for the titular track. Throughout 2015, her seventh studio record Piece by Piece issued three music videos for "Heartbeat Song", "Invincible" and "Piece by Piece". Clarkson's eighth studio album, Meaning of Life, issued music videos for "Love So Soft", "I Don't Think About You", and "Meaning of Life".

In addition to her musical work, Clarkson has appeared in film and television as an actress and a participant. She made her film debut as a lead actress on the 2003 feature From Justin to Kelly. Prior to winning American Idol, Clarkson has appeared as an extra in the television series That '80s Show and Sabrina the Teenage Witch in 2002. She made her television debut as an actress on the television drama American Dreams in 2003 and has appeared as guest judge and a mentor in various television competitions, including American Idol, Canadian Idol, X Factor, and The Voice. Clarkson starred as a judge and mentor on the short-lived series Duets in 2012 and debuted as a coach on the fourteenth season of The Voice in 2018. She also hosts her own daytime talk show, The Kelly Clarkson Show, which premiered in 2019. Clarkson has appeared in advertisements to promote brands such as Ford, NASCAR, Pepsi, Amazon Kindle, and Citizen Watches.

Video albums

Music videos

Filmography

Television

Advertisements

References

External links
 
 

Actress filmographies
Videography
Videographies of American artists
American filmographies